The Dish may refer to:

 The Dish, the 2000 Australian film
 The Dish (landmark), hills above Sanford University
 The Dish (TV series), a satirical American television show
 The Dish, a gossip website created by Jonathan Cheban